José Nambi (5 June 1949 – 31 October 2022) was an Angolan Roman Catholic prelate.

Nambi was born in Angola and ordained to the priesthood in 1975. He served as coadjutor bishop of the Roman Catholic Diocese of Kwito-Bié in 1995 and 1996 and was bishop of the diocese from 1997 until his death.

References

1949 births
2022 deaths
Angolan clergy
Roman Catholic bishops of Kwito-Bié
Bishops appointed by Pope John Paul II